Mike E. "Battleship" Kasap (November 20, 1922 – October 20, 1994) was an American football player who played at the tackle position.

A native of Oglesby, Illinois, he played college football at Illinois and Purdue. He was drafted by the Detroit Lions in the 12th round (115th overall pick) of the 1945 NFL Draft but did not play for the Lions. He played professional football in the All-America Football Conference (AAFC) for the Baltimore Colts during the 1947 season. He appeared in a total of 12 AAFC games, three as a starter. 

He coached the hockey and football teams at the University of Vermont from 1948 to 1951.

Kasap died in 1994 at LaSalle, Illinois.

References

1922 births
1994 deaths
Baltimore Colts (1947–1950) players
Illinois Fighting Illini football players
Purdue Boilermakers football players
Players of American football from Illinois
People from Oglesby, Illinois